Bojan Dimitrijević may refer to:
Bojan Dimitrijević (actor) (born 1973), Serbian actor
 (born 1968), Serbian historian
Bojan Dimitrijević (politician) (born 1963), Serbian politician and former cabinet minister